The women's 63 kilograms (Half middleweight) competition at the 2014 Asian Games in Incheon was held on 21 September at the Dowon Gymnasium.

Joung Da-woon of South Korea won the gold medal.

Schedule
All times are Korea Standard Time (UTC+09:00)

Results

Main bracket

Repechage

References

External links
 
 Official website

W63
Judo at the Asian Games Women's Half Middleweight
Asian W63